Four vessels of the Royal Navy have been named HMS Thunderbolt:

  was originally a French ship, but was captured in 1696 and commissioned into the Royal Navy. It was converted to a hulk in 1699 and broken up in 1731.
  was a wooden paddle sloop launched in 1842 and wrecked off South Africa in 1847.
  was an iron screw floating battery launched in 1856 and converted to a floating pier at Chatham in 1873. Between 1916 and 1919 it was named HMS Daedalus as a nominal depot ship for the Royal Navy Air Service. It sank in 1948 due to a collision with a tugboat, and was raised and broken up the following year.
  was a T-class submarine originally called HMS Thetis. Thetis sank during sea trials on 1 June 1939 with 4 survivors out of 103 people on board. The boat was raised, repaired, and commissioned in 1940 as HMS Thunderbolt and sunk on 14 March 1943 by the Italian corvette Cicogna.

References
 

Royal Navy ship names